Francisco Valmerino (born February 15, 1976), known as Neri, is a footballer from Brazil who last played as striker for AC Bellinzona.

Career 
He won the Swiss Super League in 2000 with FC St. Gallen.

External links
 

1976 births
Living people
Brazilian footballers
Brazilian expatriate footballers
FC St. Gallen players
FC Wil players
SC Kriens players
FC Schaffhausen players
BSC Young Boys players
FC Aarau players
Enosis Neon Paralimni FC players
AC Bellinzona players
Swiss Super League players
Swiss Challenge League players
Cypriot First Division players
Expatriate footballers in Switzerland
Expatriate footballers in Cyprus
Association football forwards
Footballers from Rio de Janeiro (city)